Johannes Borman (1620–1679), was a Dutch Golden Age still life painter.

Biography
He was born in The Hague, and may have been related to Abraham Borman, a landscape painter from the Hague. Johannes worked in Leiden during the years 1653–1658, where he became a member of the Leiden Guild of St. Luke.  In 1659 he moved to Amsterdam where he signed in as poorter, declaring that he was a painter in the Hague. He is known for fruit and flower still lifes.

References

Johannes Borman on Artnet

1620 births
1679 deaths
Dutch Golden Age painters
Dutch male painters
Artists from The Hague
Painters from Leiden
Dutch still life painters